John Gannon may refer to:
John Gannon (Australian politician) (1830–1887), member of the New South Wales Legislative Assembly
John Gannon (footballer) (born 1966), English footballer
John D. Gannon (1948–1999), American computer scientist
Sam Gannon (born 1947), real name John Gannon, Australian cricketer
John Mark Gannon (1877–1968), American clergyman of the Roman Catholic Church
John Gannon (American politician), Idaho State Representative
John Gannon (Vermont politician), Vermont State Representative